Sharon Hartman Strom is an American historian, women's studies scholar, educator, and writer. She is known for her work in United States 19th and 20th-century history, including the study of women’s rights, sexuality, labor, race, and gender. Strom is a Professor Emerita of History at University of Rhode Island.

She received a Ph.D. from Cornell University in 1969.

Publications

Articles

References

External link 
 Profile at the University of Rhode Island (URI) 

Year of birth missing (living people)
Living people
Cornell University alumni